Rewari is a city and a municipal council in Rewari district in the Indian state of Haryana. It is district headquarter of Rewari district. King of Rewari is Rao Onkar Singh. It is located in south-west Haryana around 82 km from New Delhi and 51 km from Gurugram.

Etymology 

During the Mahabharata period in ancient India, a king named Rewat had a daughter named Rewati. The father used to call her Rewa, and founded a village "Rewa Wadi" named after her. Wadi and wada mean a neighbourhood (small and big, respectively) in Hindi and many other Indian languages. When Rewa married Balram, elder brother of Krishna, the king donated the village "Rewa-Wadi" to his daughter. In the course of time, the name Rewa-Wadi became Rewari. The Royal family of Rewari traces its descent from lord krishna.

History

Medieval

Hem Chandra Vikramaditya was educated and brought up in what is now Rewari. Hem Chandra had developed a cannon foundry in Rewari, laying the foundation of a metalwork industry in brass, copper sheets. He had supplied cannons and gunpowder to Sher Shah Suri from 1535 onwards and was an adviser to the last ruler of Sur dynasty until 1553, Adil Shah Suri, when he became Prime Minister and Chief of Army. Hem Chandra had won 22 battles from Punjab to Delhi during 1553–56. He defeated Mughal king Akbar's forces at Agra and Delhi. Hem Chandra was crowned as a Vikramaditya king at Purana Quila in Delhi on 7 October 1556, reigned as king of Delhi for one month but lost to Akbar on 5 November 1556 at Panipat where he died.[8] His haveli (house) still stands in the Qutubpur area of the city, which in his day was a village in its own right.[9] His two-story haveli, with carved sandstone doorway, is made of local stone from Aravalli range, brunt-mud lakhori bricks and lime mortar. Walls are plastered with lime and painted with limewash. Roof has lakhouri bricks and stone slabs rested on timer beams. Doors and niches have stone lintels or brick arches in the local regional architecture. Over-hanging roof chhajja has stone brackets to anchor the stones.[7] Akbar made Rewari a sarkar under Delhi Suba. Aurangzeb attacked and recovered it from the rebels. Mughhals granted the local rule to Nand Ram, Ahir leader of Bolni village in 17th century which lasted up to 19th century.[10] A small Ahir principality was established there in the early century and ruled over the surrounding Ahirwal area.[11][12][13][14]

Ancient

Rewari founded by Balarama (the elder brother of Krishna), has the ruins of an ancient fort. The Rewari royal family played an important role in representing the interests of Ahirs in the army.

Modern era

Ahir Royal family of Ahirwal Shifted the capital from Mathura to Tijara and later to Rewari When Rao's of Rewari lost the battle to maratha's Rewari came under the control of Maratha Empire Maratha's made Ruler of Rewari their feudatory but later it became an independent state under Maharaja Rao Tularam Singh before passing on to East India Company and later British Raj. Rao Tula Ram, the ruler of Rewari, played a significant role in India's First War of Independence in 1857. His Kingdom was confiscated by the British Raj and made a part of Gurgaon district of Punjab province.

It remained a part of Gurgaon district until reorganisation in 1972 saw it transferred to Mahendragarh district. Further changes in 1989 led to the creation of the eponymous Rewari district.

Rezang La battle of 1962

Rewari is well known for the high proportion of soldiers and officers it contributes to the Indian army and other armed forces of India. Rezang La near Chushul in Ladakh was the site of the last stand of C Company of the 13 Kumaon battalion, during the Sino-Indian War on 18 November 1962. The C Company was composed almost entirely of Ahirs and was led by Major Shaitan Singh, who won a posthumous Param Vir Chakra for his actions. 
 
In this action 120 men of the C Company fought until their bullets finished and then fought hand-to-hand. Of the 120 men, 114 died and only six seriously injured men remained alive. Of these, five were captured POW and only one came down to inform others. A memorial was constructed in Rewari city for them.

Geography

Location
Rewari is adjacent to Rajasthan and, therefore, has dust storms in summer. Rugged hilly terrain of Aravali ranges as well as sandy dunes in the district affect the city's climate. Rewari forms a part of the National Capital Region.

It has an average elevation of 245 metres (803 feet). Rewari is 88 km away from Delhi.

Climate
The mean minimum and maximum temperature range from 0 °C to 46 °C during January (winter) and May–June (summer) respectively. The summer temperature can go up to 46 °C from May to July. Winter is from November to February and the temperature can fall to 2 °C in December and January. The temperature was recorded as 0 °C on 12 January 2012 and 31 January 2012 and below zero (−0.5 °C) on 4 January 2018.

Rain falls from July to September. A little rain is experienced during winter also.

Demographics
, Rewari city had a population of 143,021 (compared to 100,946 in 2001 and 75,342 in 1991) showing 42% growth in 2001–11-decade against 34% growth in 1991–2001 decade. Males were 75,764 (53% of the population) and females were 67,257 (47%). The overall sex ratio (female:male) was 886 compared to national average 940, and in the 0 to 6-year age group was 785 compared to national average 918. Rewari had an average literacy rate of 78%, higher than the national average of 64.3% for entire population and 74.0% for population excluding 0 to 6-year age group in 2011. Male literacy is 83% and female literacy is 73% (compared to 79% and 67% respectively in 2001). In Rewari, 11.3% of the population is under six years of age.

Rewari is one of the important cities of the Yadav dominated Ahirwal-belt. Hindi and its dialects Ahirawati and Haryanavi are spoken in Rewari.

Civic Utility / Amenities / Services

Healthcare
Rewari city has a civil hospital run by the civil administration. It has fifty beds and the capacity has been planned to increase to one hundred beds. It also has a trauma centre for attending to accidents on highways. Indian Railways has a hospital with 20 beds near Rewari railway station.

Rewari also has a number of private hospitals and nursing homes.

Economy

Industries 
Rewari has a variety of industries, from cottage industries to small-scale integrated units and automobiles and auto ancillary industries. The traditional industries are brass metalwork and ornamental shoes (Tilledar Jooti) Rewari has kept the traditional art of Tilledar Jooti alive and is famous for such ornamental local shoes. Various automobiles and auto ancillary industries in Dharuhera and Bawal industrial areas such as Harley Davison (assembling unit), Hero Moto Corp. United Breweries and many more. World's largest production of motor cycles is in Hero Moto Corp. Dharuhera plant

Rewari metal work

Rewari is famous for its traditional metalwork, particularly brass work. The brass industry began around 1535, with the help of Portuguese. During the time of Hemu, cannons were cast in Rewari for the army of Sher Shah Suri.

Attractions

Rewari Heritage Steam Locomotive Museum

Rewari Heritage Steam Locomotive Museum is the only surviving steam loco shed in India and houses some of India's last surviving steam locomotives. Built in 1893, it was the only loco shed in North India for a long time and a part of the track connecting Delhi with Peshawar. After steam engines were phased out by 1990, the loco shed remained in neglect for many years before it was decided by Indian Railways in December 2002 to revive it as a heritage museum. The shed was refurbished as a heritage tourism destination, its heritage edifice was restored and a museum exhibiting Victorian-era artefacts used on the Indian rail network, along with the old signalling system, gramophones and seats was added. The refurbished heritage museum was opened in October 2010. The engines are also available for live demonstrations.

Transport

By Air
The nearest airport is Indira Gandhi International Airport at New Delhi, 75 km away, for all domestic and international flights.

By Rail

Rewari was first connected by a railway line in 1873 when the first metre gauge railway track in India became operational. This track was laid between Delhi and Ajmer. The gauge was converted to  broad gauge in 1995 for one of the tracks. This allowed metre gauge trains from Rajasthan to continue up to Delhi Sarai Rohilla on the remaining track. The second track from Rewari to Delhi was converted to broad gauge in 2007 as all the metre gauge tracks from Rewari to cities in Rajasthan had been converted to broad gauge by then. Thus all the railway tracks from Rewari have been converted to broad gauge obviating the need for change of trains at gauge-change stations such as Delhi and Ahmedabad.

Rewari is a major junction on the Indian railway network and is connected to the major cities of India by direct trains. Six railway lines branch out from it to Delhi, Ajmer via Narnaul and Ringas, Ajmer via Alwar, Loharu via Kanina, Hisar and Jhajjar-Rohtak. The latest sixth single-track line to Jhajjar and Rohtak was constructed in 2008–12 and commissioned in January 2013. A seventh double-track line starts from Khori near Rewari to Asaoti near Palwal for facilitating carriage of goods on Western Dedicated Freight Corridor. "New Rewari" railway station has been built on this dedicated freight railway line. A line branches off from New Rewari station, goes over Rewari-Narnaul and Rewari-Kanina-Mahendragarh tracks to join the Rewari-Bhiwani railway line 2 km after the Rewari junction, thus bypassing the Rewari junction. This obviates the need for goods trains on Western Dedicated Freight Corridor to pass through Rewari junction.

Rewari-Delhi double railway track was electrified in 2018. Rewari has electrified tracks on the Jaipur-Alwar-Rewari-Bhiwani and Rewari-Narnaul-Ringas-Phulera routes. These tracks have a high catenary with 7.45 m high OHE for double-stack containers. The electrical locomotives on these tracks will have a special pantograph for the high catenary. Electric trains (EMU) may run between Delhi and Rewari in 2020. Rewari-Alwar-Bandikui and Rewari-Bhiwani routes became double tracks in 2019.

A new railway line Rapid Regional Transit System (RRTS) is being constructed from Nizamuddin station in New Delhi to Alwar via Gurgaon-Manesar-Dharuhera-Rewari-Bawal-Shahjanpur. A loop of this RRTS will have a railway station east of Rewari at village Majra Gurdas.

By Road
Rewari is connected by four national highways: NH 11 (starting from Delhi-Jaipur NH 48 and going to Narnaul-Jhunjhunu-Bikaner-Jaisalmer), NH 48 (former name NH 8 before renumbering of all national highways) (Delhi-Jaipur-Bombay-Pune-Bangalore), NH 352 (former name NH 71) (Narwana-Jind-Rohtak-Jhajjar-Rewari) and NH 919 (former name NH 71B) (Rewari-Dharuhera-Sohna-Palwal). Before NH 48 was built in early 1960s, the Rewari-Gurgaon travel was via Dharuhera-Bhiwadi-Taoru-Sohna. NH 919 was a state highway before it was declared NH a decade ago; NH 352 was newly constructed in 2011–13; and NH 11 was declared to start from Rewari only three years ago. A 4-lane bypass on NH 11 from east of Rewari city (starting at NH 352 just off NH 48) to west of Rewari city (at Khori railway station) will be constructed in 2021 to bypass the city.

State highways connect Rewari to all major towns in Haryana and adjacent districts of Rajasthan.
 SH-24 Rewari-Kanina-Mahendragarh-Loharu 92 km. 
(now in 2022, Rewari - kanina - Mahendergarh - Tosham- Hisar new national highway is announced under Bharat mala pariyojana phase 2)
 SH-26 Gurgaon-Pataudi-Rewari 52 km.
 SH-15 Shahjahanpur-Rewari 21 km.
The central government has decided to convert the two-lane SH-26 (Gurgaon-Pataudi-Rewari) to a four-lane national highway and the work on the upgradation may start in 2021 after acquisition of land.

There are frequent bus services between Rewari and Delhi, as well as other towns of Haryana, Punjab and Rajasthan.

Education

Rewari has one university, ten-degree colleges, two BEd colleges, 110 secondary / higher secondary schools, one industrial training institute and one footwear training institute. Government Higher Secondary School was started in the year 1887. Hindu High School was started by the Bhargava community in 1890 in the building now known as Bhargava Boarding House located near Bhadawas Gate. The nearest college was in the nearby princely state of Alwar until independence. Ahir College was set up in 1945 by Rao Balbir Singh, a descendant of Rao Tularam. Kishanlal Public College is another educational institute. Shishu Shala was the first English school, established in 1950 in Model Town.

A Kendriya Vidyalaya (Central School) has existed in Rewari city since 1980. A Sainik School was started in 2008, temporarily housed in Rewari city awaiting completion of construction of its permanent campus at village Gothra Tappa Khori, about 15 km southwest Rewari-Narnaul Road.

The Meerpur centre of Rohtak University was upgraded to a separate university in September

Indira Gandhi University, Rewari is a state university which was established in the year 2013.

Several private colleges have been set up around Rewari in the last decade to teach engineering, management, law, and nursing though the quality of education in some of them is low as in the rest of the country.

Villages

Notable people
 Hem Chandra Vikramaditya, who claimed the throne of Delhi defeating the Mughal army of Akbar in 1556
 Rao Tula Ram, leader of the Indian Rebellion of 1857 
 Rao Gopal Dev, leader of the Indian Rebellion of 1857
 Rao Birender Singh, former Chief Minister of Haryana
 Dr. B.K. Rao, first recipient of Padma Bhushan award in Rewari.
 Commodore Babru Bhan Yadav, MVC, led the Operation Trident against Pakistan in Indo-Pakistan war 1971
 Santosh Yadav, first female Mountaineer in India to climb Mount Everest twice.
 Yogendra Yadav, an Indian activist, psephologist and politician
 Alhar Bikaneri, Indian Hindi-Urdu poet

Delhi–Mumbai industrial corridor 
Delhi Mumbai Industrial Corridor Project is a mega infra-structural project of US$90 billion with the financial and technical aids from Japan, covering an overall length of 1,483 km between the political capital and the business capital of India, i.e., Delhi and Mumbai. It will initially link Rewari to Mumbai.
Furtherance of the project led to violent incidents in July 2012 when farmers protested against the land acquisition process. In consequence, the government of Haryana instituted a judicial probe into the events and placed a moratorium on the process.

See also
Taoru
Bhiwadi
Kanina
Mahendragarh
Neemrana

References

External links
 Rewari.gov.in 
 

 
Cities and towns in Rewari district